Razer Airport  is a public use airport serving Koran va Monjan, Badakhshan, Afghanistan.

See also
List of airports in Afghanistan

References

External links 
 Airport record for Razer Airport at Landings.com.

Airports in Afghanistan
Buildings and structures in Badakhshan Province